Dick Roberge (born April 7, 1934) is a Canadian retired professional ice hockey forward and coach. He holds the record for most minor-league goals scored with 752.  He is thought to be the inspiration behind Paul Newman's character, Reggie Dunlop, in the movie Slap Shot and appears in the film in an uncredited role as a referee.

Playing career
Roberge spent the majority of his career with the Johnstown Jets, joining the team at the start of the 1954-55 IHL season. He stayed with the Jets until the completion of the 1955-56 season where he led the league in goals scored (64) and points (118) before spending a season with the New Westminster Royals of the Western Hockey League. After playing three games with the Royals, Roberge returned to the Jets for the 1957-58 season. Roberge would lead the Jets with 37 goals but finished second in EHL scoring that season, finishing only one point behind linemate Don Hall and nine points behind Ken Coombes.

With the exception of a one-game call-up with the Pittsburgh Hornets during the 1962-63 season, Roberge remained with the Jets until his retirement after the 1971-72 EHL season. Roberge finished his career with 1,232 minor league games played, which is currently the 9th highest all-time total

Despite being born in Canada, Roberge spent a season on the U.S. National Team in 1965-66

Roberge's #11 was retired by the Johnstown Chiefs during the 1990-91 season.

Coaching career
Roberge spent several years with the Jets as a player-coach, but eventually asked to relinquish his responsibilities as coach so he could focus on playing hockey. On July 22, 1971, GM John Mitchell granted a release to Roberge from coaching the Jets

He eventually returned to the team as a full-time coach during the 1974-75 season where he led the team to the Lockhart Cup as winners of the NAHL playoffs.

Roberge later returned to Johnstown to coach the Johnstown Wings but was not nearly as successful, finishing 25-42-3.

Awards and accomplishments

Eastern Hockey League
Most goals scored, single season: 1955-56 (64); 1960–61 (56)
Most points scored, single season: 1955-56 (118); 1960–61 (116); 1964-65 (139);
Winner, Boardwalk Trophy: 1959-60; 1960–61; 1961–62

North American Hockey League
Winner, Lockhart Cup (1974–75, as coach)

Acting career

Roberge had a brief cameo in the movie Slap Shot, which was filmed in Johnstown. He appears in the film as referee Ecker, who throws the Hanson Brothers out of a game.

References

External links
 

1934 births
Canadian ice hockey coaches
Canadian ice hockey right wingers
Ice hockey people from Saskatchewan
Johnstown Jets players
Living people
New Westminster Royals players
North American Hockey League (1973–1977) coaches
Pittsburgh Hornets players
Sportspeople from Saskatoon
Canadian expatriate ice hockey players in the United States